Leonard Leslie Hubert Vale-Onslow MBE (2 May 1900 – 23 April 2004) was a motorcycle builder.
He invented the SOS racing bike in 1926. He repaired and test-rode motorbikes and lived above one of his shops in Birmingham, England, close to his three children, six grandchildren, nine great-grandchildren and three great-great-grandchildren. In 1999 he was awarded the MBE for being Britain's oldest worker and in 1999 he also became the oldest subject of This Is Your Life.

When Len was a youngster, his six older brothers ran two garages in Birmingham and they made him a small motorbike. They used to take him to Sutton Park and taught him how to ride it. He was too young to fight the First World War, though he drove a munitions lorry at 14.

He lost one brother on the Somme and another was invalided out of the forces. In the Second World War, he was pronounced unfit to serve by doctors who, as it turned out, were all to die before him.

When he was 26, he designed and built a motorbike. The frame weighed 19lb and cost 19 shillings. It was so light, that he took out a world patent on it. When World War II started, he sold the manufacturing business and he and his wife started selling motorcycles. When they had met, she was just a country girl who was staying with the parents of a friend of his. She was 16 and he was 10 years older, and when he took her to the pictures, it was to silent films. He proposed to her after they had been going out for three years.

They became a formidable business team, both being workaholics and living above the shop. They had some land where they were going to build a house, but even when they eventually became millionaires, they decided not to move. They bought more property - another three shops and a showroom and two or three smaller companies.

When his wife died in 1982, Len's heart was broken. For two years he simply could not think straight, and that was when the business went through tough times. But eventually he got over his problems and threw himself back into his work, laboring on his bikes even at night. Despite his commitment to motorbikes, Len was not quite so keen on the automobile age.

He once said in an interview:

With the traffic and all the pollution, I keeps saying cars ought to be abolished. With a car you can't feel the wind on your face or the sky like you can on a bike. There was no stress in the days when cars were a luxury; you had to walk mainly, or ride a bicycle and it was much healthier. I can't see anything has changed for the better.

He continued to ride until the age of 102. He died in 2004, shortly before his 104th birthday.

References 

British centenarians
Men centenarians
British motorcycle designers
1900 births
2004 deaths
People from Birmingham, West Midlands
Motorcycle builders
British motorcycle pioneers